Waring House may refer to:

 Waring House (Greenville, Ohio)
 Daniel Waring House, also known as Indian Hill, located just outside the village of Montgomery, New York